Psyche Debauched is a 1675 comedy play by the English writer Thomas Duffett. It was first staged by the King's Company at the Theatre Royal, Drury Lane.

The original cast included Mary Corbett as King Andrew, Mary Knep as Nicholas, Edward Lydall as Apollo, John Coysh as Jeffrey, Martin Powell as Costard, John Wiltshire as Justice Crabb, Joseph Haines as None-so-fair, Thomas Clark as Woossat.

References

Bibliography
 Van Lennep, W. The London Stage, 1660-1800: Volume One, 1660-1700. Southern Illinois University Press, 1960.

1675 plays
West End plays
Plays by Thomas Duffet
Restoration comedy